Big Shiny Tunes is a series of rock albums compiled and released by the Canadian music television station MuchMusic, and through MusiquePlus in Quebec, from 1996 to 2009. The best-selling album of the series was Big Shiny Tunes 2, which was certified Diamond in Canada (1,000,000 units) by the CRIA on March 25, 1998.  It has been cited as the best-selling album series in Canadian history, with 5 million albums sold in ten years.

Characteristics
The Big Shiny Tunes albums are each thought to be composed of a combination of rock songs that are major hits by well-known artists, less successful songs by well-known artists and songs by more obscure artists, released in the same year as the albums' publication.  There are a combination of Canadian, British and American performers. One common feature among the selected artists is that they are attached to Universal Music, Warner Bros., EMI Music Canada, and/or MuchMusic, who come together to produce Big Shiny Tunes albums. The most frequently appearing band in the Big Shiny Tunes series is Nickelback, who appeared on 7 releases in the series (Big Shiny Tunes 5, 7–11, and 14.) The first six Big Shiny Tunes albums were all released on both CD and cassette formats, before being put out solely on CD starting with Big Shiny Tunes 7 in 2002.

Part of the appeal of the series is that those who do not usually buy albums will find Big Shiny Tunes provides several well-known songs, as opposed to a CD by a single artist whose non-single tracks may be relatively unfamiliar. The music is aimed at teenagers and young adults. There has been some criticism of consistency in regards to the use of censored versus uncensored versions of songs from album to album (Big Shiny Tunes 6 carried a label stating that some songs contained coarse language, while the previous and following albums had censored songs by Matthew Good, Limp Bizkit, Staind, Not By Choice and Wheatus).

In addition to the ordinary albums in the series, MuchMusic also released albums that compile the biggest hits across a span of years, such as Big Shiny 80s (2005) that included classics like Billy Idol's "White Wedding." There have also been two volumes of Big Shiny 90s released.

History
The first edition of Big Shiny Tunes was released in 1996 and was successful, being certified Triple Platinum in Canada. Big Shiny Tunes 2 was released in 1997 to greater success, selling 128,000 copies in its first week and going on to sell 1,230,000 copies overall, making it the third best-selling album of all time in Canada of the Nielsen SoundScan era. Big Shiny Tunes 3 was released in 1998 and was also very successful, and the second and third editions alone would account for over 2,000,000 copies of Big Shiny Tunes albums sold. Following editions of Big Shiny Tunes reached #1 on the Canadian Albums Chart, the last being Big Shiny Tunes 6, which sold 68,500 copies in its first week in 2001.

The series soon lost its predominance with the growth of Peer-to-peer file sharing in the 2000s. The last album in the series, Big Shiny Tunes 14, was released in 2009. As of 2010, the series went on an indefinite hiatus and was later discontinued.

Charts and certifications

Albums

Big Shiny Tunes

Note: Was certified 3x Platinum (300,000 units) in Canada on April 24, 1997.

Big Shiny Tunes 2

Note: Best-selling album of the series. Was certified Diamond in Canada (1,000,000 units) on March 25, 1998.

Big Shiny Tunes 3

Note: Was certified 8× Platinum in Canada (800,000 units) on February 19, 1999.

Big Shiny Tunes 4
 

Note: Was certified 8× Platinum in Canada (800,000 units) on November 6, 2000.

Big Shiny Tunes 5
 

Note: Was certified 6× Platinum (600,000 units) in Canada on December 6, 2001.

Big Shiny Tunes 6
 

Note: Sold 68,500 copies in its first week. However, it has not been certified by the CRIA.

Big Shiny Tunes 7
 

Note: Was certified 3× Platinum (300,000 units) in Canada on September 17, 2009.

Big Shiny Tunes 8
 

Note: Was certified 2× Platinum (200,000 units) in Canada on January 22, 2004.

Big Shiny Tunes 9
 

Note: Was certified Platinum in Canada (100,000 units) on March 22, 2005.

Big Shiny Tunes 10
 

Notes: When the track listing was originally shown via online music stores such as Mymusic before the official site opened, songs by Green Day, Audioslave, System of a Down, Arcade Fire, Beck, and the Foo Fighters were shown to be on the album.

Big Shiny Tunes 11
 

Notes: The album's official site also lists "Stricken" by Disturbed as being on the album as well, but it doesn't appear in the final product. The album was certified Platinum in Canada (100,000 units) on February 1, 2007.

Big Shiny Tunes 12

Note: Was certified Gold in Canada (50,000 units) on July 30, 2008.

Big Shiny Tunes 13

Big Shiny Tunes 14

Big Shiny '90s
 

Disc 1:

Disc 2:

Note: Was certified 2× Platinum (200,000 units) in Canada in February 2004.

Big Shiny '90s Volume 2
 

Disc 1:

Disc 2:

Big Shiny '80s

Disc 1:
The Buggles – "Video Killed the Radio Star" (1979)
Gary Numan – "Cars" (1980)
Blondie – "Call Me" (1980)
Duran Duran – "Hungry Like the Wolf" (1984)
A Flock of Seagulls – "I Ran (So Far Away)" (1981)
The Fixx – "One Thing Leads to Another" (1985)
Talk Talk – "It's My Life" (1983)
INXS – "Original Sin" (1989)
David Bowie – "Modern Love" (1983)
Peter Gabriel – "Shock the Monkey" (1983)
The Cars – "You Might Think" (1981)
Devo – "Whip It" (1981)
Martha and the Muffins – "Echo Beach" (1980)
Squeeze – "Another Nail in My Heart" (1983)
Nena – "99 Luftballons" (1982)

Disc 2:
The Clash – "Train in Vain" (1980)
The Boomtown Rats – "I Don't Like Mondays" (1979)
Billy Idol – "White Wedding" (1982/1984)
The Pretenders – "Back on the Chain Gang" (1983)
Fine Young Cannibals – "Suspicious Minds" (1986)
Ramones – "Rock 'n' Roll High School" (1980)
The B-52's – "Love Shack" (1989)
Rough Trade – "High School Confidential" (1980)
The Psychedelic Furs – "Love My Way" (1982)
Split Enz – "I Got You" (1985)
The Dream Academy – "Life in a Northern Town" (1986)
Chalk Circle – "April Fool" (1985)
Tears for Fears – "Pale Shelter" (1982/1983)
The Cure – "In Between Days" (1985)
Naked Eyes – "Always Something There to Remind Me" (1983)

See also
MuchDance
((DIRECT))

References

External links
MuchMusic's Big Shiny Tunes 12 website
MuchMusic's Big Shiny Tunes 13 website

Compilation album series
Much (TV channel)